Sterling silver is an alloy of silver containing 92.5% by weight of silver and 7.5% by weight of other metals, usually copper. The sterling silver standard has a minimum millesimal fineness of 925.

Fine silver, which is 99.9% pure silver, is relatively soft, so silver is usually alloyed with copper to increase its hardness and strength. Sterling silver is prone to tarnishing, and elements other than copper can be used in alloys to reduce tarnishing, as well as casting porosity and firescale. Such elements include germanium, zinc, platinum, silicon, and boron. Recent examples of these alloys include argentium, sterlium and silvadium.

Etymology
One of the earliest attestations of the term is in Old French form , in a charter of the abbey of Les Préaux, dating to either 1085 or 1104. The word in origin refers to the newly introduced Norman silver penny.

According to the Oxford English Dictionary, the most plausible etymology is a derivation from a late Old English  (with, or like, a 'little star'), as some early Norman pennies were imprinted with a small star.

In 1260, Henry III granted them a charter of protection. Because the League's money was not frequently debased like that of England, English traders stipulated to be paid in pounds of the Easterlings, which was contracted to sterling.

The Hanseatic League was officially active in the London trade from 1266 to 1597. This etymology may have been first suggested by Walter de Pinchebek (c. 1300) with the explanation that the coin was originally made by moneyers from that region.

The claim has been made in Henry Spelman's glossary as referenced in Commentaries on the Laws of England by William Blackstone. Yet another claim on this same hypothesis is from William Camden, as quoted in Chamber's Journal of Popular Literature, Science and Arts, Volume 4. By 1854, the tie between Easterling and Sterling was well-established, as Ronald Zupko quotes in his dictionary of weights.

The British numismatist Philip Grierson disagrees with the "star" etymology, as the stars appeared on Norman pennies only for the single three-year issue from 1077 to 1080 (the Normans changed coin designs every three years). Grierson's proposed alternative is that sterling derives from ster meaning 'strong' or 'stout', by analogy with the Byzantine solidus, originally known as the  meaning 'solid gold' or 'reliable gold'. In support of this he cites the fact that one of the first acts of the Normans was to restore the coinage to the consistent weight and purity it had in the days of Offa, King of Mercia. This would have been perceived as a contrast to the progressive debasement of the intervening 200 years, and would therefore be a likely source for a nickname.

S.E. Rigold disputes the origin being Norman, stating, "that, while medieval British coins seldom copy or are copied by those of France, they have many typological connexions with the lands to the east—the Netherlands, the Baltic, Germany, and even deeper regions of central Europe."

History 

The sterling alloy originated in continental Europe and was being used for commerce as early as the 12th century in the area that is now northern Germany.

A piece of sterling silver dating from Henry II's reign was used as a standard in the Trial of the Pyx until it was deposited at the Royal Mint in 1843. It bears the royal stamp ENRI. REX ("King Henry") but this was added later, in the reign of Henry III. The first legal definition of sterling silver appeared in 1275, when a statute of Edward I specified that 12 troy ounces of silver for coinage should contain 11 ounces  pennyweights of silver and  pennyweights of alloy, with 20 pennyweights to the troy ounce. This is (not precisely) equivalent to a millesimal fineness of 926.

In Colonial America, sterling silver was used for currency and general goods as well. Between 1634 and 1776, some 500 silversmiths created items in the "New World" ranging from simple buckles to ornate Rococo coffee pots. Although silversmiths of this era were typically familiar with all precious metals, they primarily worked in sterling silver. The colonies lacked an assay office during this time (the first would be established in 1814), so American silversmiths adhered to the standard set by the London Goldsmiths Company: sterling silver consisted of 91.5–92.5% by weight silver and 8.5–7.5 wt% copper. Stamping each of their pieces with their personal maker's mark, colonial silversmiths relied upon their own status to guarantee the quality and composition of their products.

Colonial silversmiths used many of the techniques developed by those in Europe. Casting was frequently the first step in manufacturing silver pieces, as silver workers would melt down sterling silver into easily manageable ingots. Occasionally, they would create small components (e.g. teapot legs) by casting silver into iron or graphite molds, but it was rare for an entire piece to be fabricated via casting.

More commonly, a silversmith would forge an ingot into the desired shape, often hammering the thinned silver against specially shaped dies to "mass produce" simple shapes like the oval end of a spoon. The hammering occurred at room temperature, and, like any cold forming process, caused work hardening of the silver, which become increasingly brittle and difficult to shape. To restore the workability, the silversmith would anneal the piece—that is, heat it to a dull red and then quench it in water—to relieve the stresses in the material and return it to a more ductile state.

Hammering required more time than all other silver manufacturing processes, and therefore accounted for the majority of labor costs. Silversmiths would then seam parts together to create complex and artistic items, sealing the gaps with a solder of 80 wt% silver and 20 wt% bronze. Finally, they would file and polish their work to remove all seams, finishing off with engraving and stamping the smith's mark.

The American revolutionary Paul Revere was regarded as one of the best silversmiths from this "Golden Age of American Silver". Following the Revolutionary War, Revere acquired and made use of a silver rolling mill from England. Not only did the rolling mill increase his rate of production—hammering and flattening silver took most of a silversmith's time—he was able to roll and sell silver of appropriate, uniform thickness to other silversmiths. He retired a wealthy artisan, his success partly due to this strategic investment. Although he is celebrated for his beautiful hollowware, Revere made his fortune primarily on low-end goods produced by the mill, such as flatware. With the onset of the first Industrial Revolution, silversmithing declined as an artistic occupation.

From about 1840 to 1940 in the United States and Europe, sterling silver cutlery (US: 'flatware') became de rigueur when setting a proper table. There was a marked increase in the number of silver companies that emerged during that period. The height of the silver craze was during the 50-year period from 1870 to 1920. Flatware lines during this period sometimes included up to 100 different types of pieces.

Hallmarks 

Some countries developed systems of hallmarking silver:
 To indicate the purity of the silver alloy used in the manufacture or hand-crafting of the piece.
 To identify the silversmith or company that made the piece.
 To note the date and/or location of the manufacture or tradesman.
 To reduce the amount of counterfeiting of silver items.

Uses

Individual eating implements often included: 
forks (dinner fork,  salad fork, pastry fork, or shrimp fork)
spoons (teaspoon, coffee spoon, demitasse spoon, iced tea spoon) and
 knives (dinner knife, butter spreader, cheese knife). 
This was especially true during the Victorian period, when etiquette dictated no food should be touched with one's fingers.

Serving pieces were often elaborately decorated and pierced and embellished with ivory, and could include any or all of the following: carving knife and fork, salad knife and fork, cold meat fork, punch ladle, soup ladle, gravy ladle, casserole-serving spoon, berry spoon, lasagna server, macaroni server, asparagus server, cucumber server, tomato server, olive spoon, cheese scoop, fish knife and fork, pastry server, petit four server, cake knife, bon bon spoon, salt spoon, sugar sifter or caster and crumb remover with brush.

Cutlery sets were often accompanied by tea sets, hot water pots, chocolate pots, trays and salvers, goblets, demitasse cups and saucers, liqueur cups, bouillon cups, egg cups, plates, napkin rings, water and wine pitchers and coasters, candelabra and even elaborate centerpieces.

The interest in sterling silver extended to business (paper clips, mechanical pencils, letter openers, calling card boxes, cigarette cases), to the boudoir (dresser trays, mirrors, hair and suit brushes, pill bottles, manicure sets, shoehorns, perfume bottles, powder bottles, hair clips) and even to children (cups, cutlery, rattles).

Other uses of the specific silver alloy include:

 Use as surgical and medical instruments as early as Ur, Hellenistic-era Egypt and Rome, and their use continued until largely replaced in Western countries in the mid to late 20th century by cheaper, disposable plastic items and sharper, more durable steel ones. The alloy's natural malleability is an obvious physical advantage, but it is also naturally aseptic.
 Some brasswind instrument manufacturers use 92.5% sterling silver as the material for making their instruments, including the flute and saxophone. For example, some leading saxophone manufacturers such as Selmer and Yanagisawa have crafted some of their saxophones from sterling silver.
Use as jewelry rings, bracelets, earrings and necklaces.

Tarnish and corrosion 

Chemically, silver is not very reactive—it does not react with oxygen or water at ordinary temperatures, so does not easily form a silver oxide. However, it is attacked by common components of atmospheric pollution: silver sulfide slowly appears as a black tarnish during exposure to airborne compounds of sulfur (byproducts of the burning of fossil fuels and some industrial processes), and low level ozone reacts to form silver oxide. As the purity of the silver decreases, the problem of corrosion or tarnishing increases because other metals in the alloy, usually copper, may react with oxygen in the air.

The black silver sulfide (Ag2S) is among the most insoluble salts in aqueous solution, a property that is exploited for separating silver ions from other positive ions.

Sodium chloride (NaCl) or common table salt is known to corrode silver-copper alloy, typically seen in silver salt shakers where corrosion appears around the holes in the top.

Several products have been developed for the purpose of polishing silver that serve to remove sulfur from the metal without damaging or warping it. Because harsh polishing and buffing can permanently damage and devalue a piece of antique silver, valuable items are typically hand-polished to preserve the unique patinas of older pieces. Techniques such as wheel polishing, which are typically performed by professional jewelers or silver repair companies, are reserved for extreme tarnish or corrosion.

See also 
Britannia silver, a higher grade silver alloy (95.8% compared to Sterling silver's 92.5%)
Argentium sterling silver, a higher grade silver alloy with unique working properties (93.6% or 96%)
Coin silver, .900 fine silver widely used in pre-1964 United States coinage
Pound sterling, the official currency of the United Kingdom, which once was based on a weight in sterling silver
Weighted sterling, items with a silver surface and a composite of other materials

Footnotes

References

Works cited 

 All About Antique Silver with International Hallmarks, 2nd printing (2007), by Diana Sanders Cinamon, AAA Publishing, San Bernardino, CA.
 Origins: A Short Etymological Dictionary of Modern English, by lexicographer Eric Partridge.
 Silver in America, 1840–1940: A Century of Splendor, third edition (1997), by Charles L. Venable; Harry N. Abrams, Inc., New York, NY.
 Tiffany Silver Flatware, 1845–1905: When Dining Was an Art, by William P. Hood, Jr.; 1999; published by the Antique Collectors Club Ltd., Suffolk, England.
 The Encyclopedia of American Silver Manufacturers, revised fourth edition (1998), by Dorothy T. Rainwater and Judy Redfield; Schiffer Publishing Ltd., Atglen, PA.
 The Book of Old Silver, English – American – Foreign, With All Available Hallmarks Including Sheffield Plate Marks, by Seymour B. Wyler; 1937; Crown Publishers, Inc., New York, NY.
 International Hallmarks on Silver Collected by Tardy, 5th English Language reprint (2000); original publication date unknown, date of first softcover publication 1985; author unknown; publisher unknown.
 
 
 
 

Jewellery
Silversmithing
Silver
Coinage metals and alloys